Celandine ( or ) is a common name for three species of flowers:
Chelidonium majus, greater celandine, in the poppy family
Ficaria verna, Lesser celandine (formerly Ranunculus ficaria), in the buttercup family
Stylophorum diphyllum, celandine-poppy, in the poppy family

Celandine may also refer to:
Celandine (novel), a novel by Steve Augarde
HMS Celandine